Stepankovo is a rural locality (a village) in Kurilovskoye Rural Settlement, Sobinsky District, Vladimir Oblast, Russia. The population was 32 as of 2010.

Geography 
Stepankovo is located on the Vorsha River, 17 km northwest of Sobinka (the district's administrative centre) by road. Koroyedovo is the nearest rural locality.

References 

Rural localities in Sobinsky District